IROC II was the second year of IROC competition, which took place over three weekends in 1974 and 1975. It saw the use of the Chevrolet Camaro in all races, which replaced the Porsche Carrera RSR race cars used in the first year of competition. The only track carried over from the first year was Riverside International Raceway, as the series raced on the oval at Daytona International Speedway instead of the infield road course. Michigan International Speedway was also added as the second oval in the schedule, which consisted of four races. Bobby Unser won the series championship and $41,000.

The roster of drivers and final points standings were as follows:

Race results

Michigan International Speedway, Race One

 Bobby Unser
 Cale Yarborough
 David Pearson
 Bobby Allison
 George Follmer
 Emerson Fittipaldi
 Ronnie Peterson
 Johnny Rutherford
 A. J. Foyt
 Richard Petty
 Graham Hill
 Jody Scheckter

Riverside International Raceway, Race Two

 Emerson Fittipaldi
 George Follmer
 A. J. Foyt
 David Pearson
 Richard Petty
 Jody Scheckter
 Ronnie Peterson
 Cale Yarborough
 Johnny Rutherford
 Graham Hill
 Bobby Unser
 Bobby Allison

Riverside International Raceway, Race Three

 Bobby Allison
 Bobby Unser
 Emerson Fittipaldi
 A. J. Foyt
 George Follmer
 Graham Hill
 Johnny Rutherford
 Ronnie Peterson
 Cale Yarborough
 Richard Petty
 David Pearson
 Jody Scheckter

Daytona International Speedway, Race Four

 Bobby Unser
 A. J. Foyt
 Cale Yarborough
 Bobby Allison
 David Pearson
 Emerson Fittipaldi
 Ronnie Peterson
 George Follmer
 Johnny Rutherford

References

External links
IROC II History - IROC Website

International Race of Champions
1974 in American motorsport
1975 in American motorsport